Pippo Franco (pseudonym of Franco Pippo) was born 2 September 1940 and is an Italian actor, comedian, television presenter, and singer. He made his name first as a musician in the early 1960s, and in the late 1960s began a career in film, starring in a great number of commedia sexy all'italiana, the "sexy comedy" subgenre of Italian comedy. In the 1970s he expanded into television, acting in TV movies and presenting variety shows. His type of comedy borrows heavily from cabaret. Throughout his career he continued to sing, appearing many times at the Sanremo Festival. He has made children's music as well, and has co-written three books on (linguistic) humor.

Biography 
Franco was born in Rome to an Irpinian family, who had moved to Rome from Vallata, in the Province of Avellino.

Cinema 
Franco's first role in a box office hit was 1969's Nell'anno del Signore, directed by Luigi Magni and starring "an exceptional cast of actors" including Franco, Nino Manfredi and Claudia Cardinale.

In the 1970s and 1980s he starred in a large number of Italian comedies, many of them erotic comedies such as the 1972 Mariano Laurenti production Quel gran pezzo dell'Ubalda tutta nuda e tutta calda, a semi-medieval erotic spoof (a "decamerotic" film) distributed in the US as Ubalda, all naked and warm, in which Franco starred (with "undeniable comic verve") alongside Edwige Fenech, the Algerian-born last "popular incarnation of the 'sex bombs' so in vogue twenty years earlier." The success of Ubalda was followed by another successful movie with Franco and Edwige, Sergio Martino's Giovannona Coscialunga disonorata con onore (1973). Franco again worked with Martino and Fenech in 1980 in Zucchero, miele e peperoncino and in 1982 in Ricchi, ricchissimi... praticamente in mutande, though Franco and Fenech did not share any scenes in these anthologies. In 1972 he had a part in Billy Wilder's Italian/American comedy Avanti! alongside Jack Lemmon and Juliet Mills. He directed his first movie in 1981, La gatta da pelare, for which he also wrote the score and the script.

Television 
Franco began a career in television in 1971 with Riuscirà il cav. papà Ubu?, directed by Vito Molinari and Giuseppe Recchia, and from then on played in a number of made-for-television movies.

Franco has appeared on numerous Italian TV shows as comic and as presenter. In 1980, he presented the weekly television show of the drawing of the Italian lottery, with Laura Troschel (then his wife) and Claudio Cecchetto. In the 1990s he appeared on the comedy show La sai l'ultima? with English TV presenter Harold Davies (actor), and in the 2000s he presented the variety show Bellissima: Cabaret Anticrisi, in cooperation with the variety company Il Bagaglino.

Music 
Franco began singing and playing guitar at the end of the 1950s, and started writing songs with surreal lyrics. One of his groups, The Penguins, made its debut in 1960 in the musicarello by Mario Mattoli for Appuntamento a Ischia, and accompanied Mina Mazzini on three songs, "La nonna Magdalena," "Il cielo in una stanza", and "Una zebra a pois."

In 1968 he scored a minor hit with the single "Vedendo una foto di Bob Dylan," which made fun of the gap between beatniks and their parents.

As a singer he recorded more than a dozen albums, including Cara Kiri (1971), Bededè (1975), Al cabaret (1977), Praticamente, no? (1978), Pippo nasone and Vietato ai minori (1981). One of his most famous song is Cesso.

His songs were recorded on more than fifteen 45 rpm vinyl records, including several hits like La licantropia (1969), which participated in Cantagiro 1969.

Beginning in the late 1970s, Franco began playing and composing children's music, as well as music for the shows by the Italian lottery.

Between 1979 and 1984 he was an annual performer and presenter at the popular music festival in San Remo. He returned there in 2008.

Books
With Antonio Di Stefano he wrote three books with stories and commentaries on (unintentionally) humorous linguistic blunders and mishaps, Non prenda niente tre volte al giorno (2002), Qui chiavi subito (2006), and L'occasione fa l'uomo ragno. Strafalcioni, cartelli, scritte sui muri e altri capolavori di umorismo involontario (2007), all published by Mondadori.

Politics 
In the 2006 Italian general election he was a candidate for the Italian Senate from the list of Christian Democracy for the Autonomies in Lazio. Despite the publicly stated support of Giulio Andreotti, Pippo Franco's party got only 0.6% of votes in Lazio and therefore it was not elected.

Filmography

Movies

 1968 – Chimera, directed by Ettore Maria Fizzarotti
 1969 – Nell'anno del Signore, directed by Luigi Magni
 1969 - Hate Is My God, directed by Claudio Gora
 1969 - Zingara, directed by Mariano Laurenti
 1969 - Il giovane normale, directed by Dino Risi
 1969 – Pensiero d'amore, directed by Mario Amendola
 1970 – Basta guardarla, directed by Luciano Salce
 1970 – W le donne, directed by Aldo Grimaldi
 1970 – Il debito coniugale, directed by Franco Prosperi
 1971 – Mazzabubù... Quante corna stanno quaggiù?, directed by Mariano Laurenti
 1972 – Boccaccio, directed by Bruno Corbucci
 1972 – Ubalda, All Naked and Warm, directed by Mariano Laurenti
 1972 – Avanti!, directed by Billy Wilder
 1973 - Rugantino, directed by Pasquale Festa Campanile
 1973 - Furto di sera bel colpo si spera, directed by Mariano Laurenti
 1973 – Patroclooo! E il soldato Camillone, grande grosso e frescone, directed by Mariano Laurenti
 1973 – Giovannona Long-Thigh, directed by Sergio Martino
 1974 – La via dei babbuini, directed by Luigi Magni
 1974 – La sbandata, directed by Alfredo Malfatti and Salvatore Samperi
 1976 – Hanno ucciso un altro bandito, directed by Guglielmo Garroni
 1976 – Remo e Romolo – Storia di due figli di una lupa, directed by Mario Castellacci and Pier Francesco Pingitore
 1977 – Nerone, directed by Mario Castellacci and Pier Francesco Pingitore
 1978 – L'inquilina del piano di sopra, directed by Ferdinando Baldi
 1978 – Scherzi da prete, directed by Pier Francesco Pingitore
 1979 – Tutti a squola, directed by Pier Francesco Pingitore
 1979 – L'imbranato, directed by Pier Francesco Pingitore
 1980 – Arrivano i bersaglieri, directed by Luigi Magni
 1980 – Il casinista, directed by Pier Francesco Pingitore
 1980 – Ciao marziano, directed by Pier Francesco Pingitore
 1980 - Il ficcanaso (also known as La profesora se desnuda), directed by Bruno Corbucci
 1980 - Sugar, Honey and Pepper, directed by Sergio Martino
 1981 - La gatta da pelare, directed and scored by Pippo Franco
 1982 – Don't Play with Tigers, directed by Sergio Martino
 1982 - Attenti a quei P2, directed by Pier Francesco Pingitore
 1983 - Sfrattato cerca casa equo canone, directed by Pier Francesco Pingitore
 1983 – Due strani papà, directed by Mariano Laurenti
 1983 – Il tifoso, l'arbitro e il calciatore, directed by Pier Francesco Pingitore
 1992 – Gole ruggenti, directed by Pier Francesco Pingitore
 2010 – Il Numero 2, directed by Vito Cea
 2016 – Tiramisù, directed by Fabio De Luigi

Television 

 1971 – Riuscirà il cav. papà Ubu?, directed by Vito Molinari and Giuseppe Recchia
 1973 – Dove sta Zazà, directed by Antonello Falqui
 1975 – Mazzabubù, directed by Antonello Falqui
 1978 – Il Ribaltone, directed by Antonello Falqui
 1979 – C'era una volta Roma, directed by Pier Francesco Pingitore
 1979 – I racconti di fantascienza di Blasetti, episode "L'assassino," directed by Alessandro Blasetti
 1990 – Senator, directed by Gianfrancesco Lazotti
 1997 – Ladri si nasce, directed by Pier Francesco Pingitore
 1998 – Ladri si diventa, directed by Pier Francesco Pingitore
 1999 – Tre stelle, directed by Pier Francesco Pingitore
 2000 – La casa delle beffe, directed by Pier Francesco Pingitore
 2007 – Di che peccato sei?, directed by Pier Francesco Pingitore

Discography

Singles
 1967 – "Vedendo una foto di Bob Dylan"/"Mister Custer," Arc, AN 4111 (7")
 1969 – "Qualsiasi cosa faccia"/"La licantropia," Dischi Ricordi, SRL 10557 (7")
 1976 – "Praticamente no"/"I scherzi stupidi," Cinevox, SC 1086 (7")
 1977 – "Isotta"/"Ninna Nanna Nonna," Cinevox, SC 1103 (7")
 1977 – "Quanto sei bella Roma"/"L'autostop," Cinevox, SC 1099 (7" – single by Laura Troschel featuring Pippo Franco)
 1977 – "Il Bello e la Bestia," Cinevox (7" – single by Laura Troschel featuring Pippo Franco)
 1978 – "Di questo bel terzetto"/"Pippo Nonna," Cinevox, SC 1116 (7")
 1979 – "Mi scappa la pipì, papà"/"Dai compra," Cinevox, SC 1124 (7")
 1979 – "Ammazza quant è bra"/"Andiamocene a Casa," Lupus, LUN 4902 (7" – single from C'era una volta Roma)
 1979 – "Tu per me sei come Roma" (with Laura Troschel), Cinevox, SC 1135
 1980 – "Dai lupone dai"/"La gente mi vuole male," Cinevox, SC 1141
 1980 – "La puntura"/"Sono Pippo col naso," Lupus, LUN 4906 (7")
 1980 – "Prendi la fortuna per la coda"/"Aria di festa," Lupus, LUN 4912
 1980 – "Mandami una cartolina"/"Lezione di inglese," Lupus, LUN 4914
 1982 – "Che fico!"/"Ma guarda un po," Lupus, LUN 4926
 1983 – "Chì Chì Chì Cò Cò Cò"/"Caaasa," Lupus, LUN 4943 (7")
 1984 – "Pinocchio Chiò"/"La pantofola," Dischi Ricordi, SRL 11000 (7")
 1986 – "Pepè"/"Pollice," Cinevox, SC 1194
 1988 – "Il ballo marocchino"/"Strum," Five Record, FM 13206 (7")
 1988 – "Due risate"/"Biberon," LGO Music, N-012190

LP 

 1968 – I Personaggi Di Pippo Franco
 1971 – Cara Kiri, Dischi Ricordi, SMRL 6085; Cinevox, ORL 8053
 1975 – Bededè, Cinevox, SC33/22
 1977 – Al cabaret, Cinevox, SC33/32 (theatrical show with Bombolo and Sergio Leonardi)
 1978 – Praticamente no, Cinevox, ORL8301
 1979 – Busti al Pincio, Cinevox, CAB2001 (theatrical show)
 1979 – C'era una volta Roma, Cinevox, CAB2005 (theatrical show with Laura Troschel)
 1981 – Vietato ai minori, Lupus, LULP 14905
 1984 – Pippomix, Dischi Ricordi, TSMRL6319 (collection)
 Super Pippo Franco Bambini, WEA, EAN 0008696 (collection of singles and b-sides)

Reference: Franco discography

Books

 1981 – Il matto in casa, Editoriale Due I.
 2001 – Pensieri per vivere. Itinerario di evoluzione interiore, Edizioni Mediterranee. 
 2003 – Non prenda niente tre volte al giorno. Il lato comico dell'esperienza umana (with Antonio Di Stefano), Mondadori. 
 2006 – Qui chiavi subito. Insegne, annunci, cognomi e strafalcioni tutti da ridere (with Antonio Di Stefano), Mondadori. 
 2007 – L'occasione fa l'uomo ragno. Strafalcioni, cartelli, scritte sui muri e altri capolavori di umorismo involontario (with Antonio Di Stefano), Mondadori.

See also
Italian cinema

References

Bibliography 
 Andrea Jelardi, Queer tv, omosessualità e trasgressione nella televisione italiana. Rome: Croce.
 Andrea Jelardi and Giuseppe Farruggio, In scena en travesti, Il travestitismo nello spettacolo italiano.Rome: Croce, 2009.

External links
 
 Pippo Franco reciterà nel cinepanettone materano, “Il Numero 2″.
Interview with Franco.

1940 births
Living people
Italian male comedians
Italian pop singers
Italian television presenters
Musicians from Rome
Italian comedy musicians
People of Campanian descent
People of Marchesan descent